The following radio stations broadcast on FM frequency 99.9 MHz:

Argentina

 La 100 in Buenos Aires
 Estación del Sur in Rosario, Santa Fe
 León FM in Rosario, Santa Fe
 X99 in Bahía Blanca, Buenos Aires
 99.9 in Mar del Plata, Buenos Aires
 Ciudad in San Genaro, Santa Fe
 Omega in Gualeguaychú, Entre Ríos
 Mágica in Barranqueras, Chaco
 Cooperativa in Anisacate, Córdoba
 Yguazú in Puerto Iguazú, Misiones
 LVQ in Necochea, Buenos Aires
 Like in Sampacho, Córdoba
 Agua in Tandil, Buenos Aires
 LRH 318 Don Orione in Sáenz Peña, Chaco
 Olivos in Mendoza
 Pop in San Nicolás de los Arroyos, Buenos Aires
 Maximo in Santa Rosa, La Pampa
 Calden in Bernasconi, La Pampa
 Latina in Lamadrid, Buenos Aires
 100 Federal in Federal, Entre Rïos
 Top in Arroyito, Córdoba
 Rio in Romang, Santa Fe
 UNPA in Río Gallegos, Santa Cruz

Australia
 2PNN in Goulburn, New South Wales
 Rhema FM in Port Macquarie, New South Wales
 2SWR in Sydney, New South Wales
 Radio TAB in Rockhampton, Queensland
 5MBS in Adelaide, South Australia
3WIZ in Melbourne, Victoria
 3TFM in Sale, Victoria

Canada (Channel 260)

 CBCS-FM in Sudbury, Ontario
 CBK-FM-5 in North Battleford, Saskatchewan
 CBMA-FM in Rouyn, Quebec
 CBR-FM-1 in Red Deer, Alberta
 CBU-FM-7 in Chilliwack, British Columbia
 CBWC-FM in Moose Lake, Manitoba
 CBWG-FM in Gillam, Manitoba
 CBWN-FM in God's Lake Narrows, Manitoba
 CHJX-FM in London, Ontario
 CFGX-FM in Sarnia, Ontario
 CFNM-FM in Nemaska, Quebec
 CFVM-FM in Amqui, Quebec
 CFWM-FM in Winnipeg, Manitoba
 CHEF-FM in Matagami, Quebec
 CHOY-FM in Moncton, New Brunswick
 CHPQ-FM in Parksville, British Columbia
 CHSU-FM in Kelowna, British Columbia
 CHTC-FM in Tsiigehtchic, Northwest Territories
 CHTN-FM-1 in Elmira, Prince Edward Island
 CJGM-FM in Gananoque, Ontario
 CJIJ-FM in Sydney, Nova Scotia
 CJMG-FM-2 in Oliver, British Columbia
 CJRG-FM-6 in Petite-Vallee, Quebec
 CJRI-FM-2 in St. Stephen, New Brunswick
 CJUK-FM in Thunder Bay, Ontario
 CJWC-FM-1 in Tofino, British Columbia
 CKFM-FM in Toronto, Ontario
 CKIQ-FM in Iqaluit, Nunavut
 CKIQ-FM-2 in Rankin Inlet, Nunavut
 CKJJ-FM-2 in Brockville, Ontario
 CKOK-FM in Nain, Newfoundland and Labrador
 CKQB-FM-1 in Pembroke, Ontario
 CKSB-4-FM in Flin Flon, Manitoba
 CKSB-5-FM in Thompson, Manitoba
 VF2100 in Fort St. James, British Columbia
 VF2156 in Poste Laverendrye, Quebec
 VF2415 in Fraser Lake, British Columbia
 VF2508 in Golden, British Columbia
 VOAR-10-FM in Port-aux-Basques, Newfoundland and Labrador

Germany
 Radio Ramasuri in Weiden, Bavaria
 Radio Alpenwelle south of Munich

Guatemala (Channel 80)
 Radio Punto in Escuintla
 Galaxia La Picosa in Quetzaltenango, Retalhuleu,, Mazatenango, Zacapa, Chiquimula
 La Ley FM in Tacaná, San Marcos

Indonesia
 Z99.9 FM in Jakarta, Indonesia

Malaysia
 988 FM in Johor Bahru, Johor and Singapore
 Asyik FM in Damak, Pahang

Mexico
 XHCJX-FM in Bahía de Banderas, Nayarit
 XHCTC-FM in Ciudad Cuauhtémoc, Chihuahua
 XHEBCS-FM in La Paz, Baja California Sur
 XHELA-FM in Candela, Coahuila
 XHEMZ-FM in Emiliano Zapata, Tabasco
 XHEPX-FM in El Vigía, Oaxaca
 XHETOR-FM in Torreón-Matamoros, Coahuila (clear from 107.5)
 XHEV-FM in Izucar de Matamoros, Puebla
 XHKB-FM in Guadalajara, Jalisco 
 XHNNO-FM in Naco, Sonora
 XHSCDP-FM in Tecoaleche, Guadalupe Municipality, Zacatecas
 XHSCHP-FM in Tarímbaro, Michoacán
 XHSG-FM in Piedras Negras, Coahuila
 XHSIL-FM in Siltepec, Chiapas
 XHSO-FM in León, Guanajuato
 XHTE-FM in Tehuacán, Puebla

Philippines
DYCU in Puerto Princesa City
DZWR in Baguio City
DZGV in Batangas City
DWEB in Nabua, Camarines Sur
DYFJ in Bacolod City
DXMR-FM in Cagayan de Oro City

Taiwan
 Kiss Radio Taiwan in Kaohsiung

United States (Channel 260)

 KAHG-LP in Hood River, Oregon
 KAQQ-LP in Alliance, Nebraska
  in Austin, Minnesota
 KBAT in Monahans, Texas
 KBDP-LP in Bridgeport, Nebraska
 KBFL-FM in Fair Grove, Missouri
  in Bozeman, Montana
  in Mount Bullion, California
  in Saint Joseph, Minnesota
  in New Sharon, Iowa
 KDUB-LP in Watsonville, California
 KDVP-LP in Denton, Texas
  in Fruita, Colorado
  in Phoenix, Arizona
  in Warrenton, Missouri
  in Ketchikan, Alaska
 KGHO-LP in Hoquiam, Washington
  in Omaha, Nebraska
  in Monticello, Arkansas
 KHIH in Liberty, Texas
 KHQR-LP in Harlingen, Texas
 KIRK (FM) in Macon, Missouri
 KISW in Seattle, Washington
  in Kahului, Hawaii
  in Cheyenne, Wyoming
 KKTC in Angel Fire, New Mexico
 KLKV in Hunt, Texas
 KLMB in Klein, Montana
  in Wichita Falls, Texas
 KMGG-LP in Albuquerque, New Mexico
 KMKR-LP in Tucson, Arizona
  in Mineola, Texas
  in Minot, North Dakota
 KNJC-LP in Houston, Texas
  in San Bernardino, California
 KONY in Saint George, Utah
 KPHT-LP in Laytonville, California
 KPVO in Fountain Green, Utah
  in Marysville, California
  in Albany, Oregon
 KRVT-LP in Rancho Viejo, Texas
  in Robstown, Texas
 KSEP-LP in Brookings, Oregon
 KSGS-LP in Rio Grande City, Texas
 KSKG in Salina, Kansas
  in Fort Smith, Arkansas
 KTDY in Lafayette, Louisiana
 KTEZ in Zwolle, Louisiana
  in Kalaheo, Hawaii
  in Clovis, New Mexico
 KTRO-LP in Espanola, New Mexico
  in El Paso, Texas
  in Hallettsville, Texas
  in Santa Barbara, California
 KUAA-LP in Salt Lake City, Utah
 KUPR-LP in Placitas, New Mexico
 KUPY in Sugar City, Idaho
 KVBN-LP in Enid, Oklahoma
  in Moorhead, Minnesota
  in Pueblo, Colorado
 KWCK-FM in Searcy, Arkansas
  in Leoti, Kansas
 KWMG-LP in White City, Oregon
 KWRG-LP in Wrangell, Alaska
  in Spokane, Washington
 KXRW-LP in Vancouver, Washington
  in Thoreau, New Mexico
 KYBS-LP in Balch Springs, Texas
 KYMZ in Somerton, Arizona
  in Burley, Idaho
  in Naylor, Missouri
 KZOA-LP in Mission, Texas
  in Waco, Texas
 WBTZ in Plattsburgh, New York
 WCHD in Kettering, Ohio
  in Creedmoor, North Carolina
 WEHF-LP in Bennettsville, South Carolina
 WEJM-LP in Mount Zion, North Carolina
  in Bridgeport, Connecticut
 WFEL-LP in Antioch, Illinois
  in Frederick, Maryland
  in Middleburg, Florida
 WGNW in Cornell, Wisconsin
  in Rogers City, Michigan
 WHDX in Waves, North Carolina
 WHHB in Holliston, Massachusetts
  in Havertown, Pennsylvania
 WIII (FM) in Cortland, New York
 WIME-LP in Orlando, Florida
  in San Juan, Puerto Rico
 WIZU-LP in Newark, Delaware
 WJRQ-LP in Poinciana, Florida
  in Janesville, Wisconsin
  in Boca Raton, Florida
  in Toledo, Ohio
 WKMY in Athol, Massachusetts
  in Old Fort, North Carolina
  in Boiling Spring Lakes, North Carolina
  in Vancleve, Kentucky
 WMXC in Mobile, Alabama
 WNNG-FM in Unadilla, Georgia
  in Easton, Pennsylvania
 WOGJ-LP in Orlando, Florida
 WOOP-LP in Cleveland, Tennessee
  in Harrisburg, Illinois
 WPKA-LP in Apopka, Florida
 WQBR (FM) in Avis, Pennsylvania
 WQEB-LP in Winchester, Massachusetts
 WQLQ in Benton Harbor, Michigan
  in Tallassee, Alabama
  in Barnstable, Massachusetts
  in Eva, Alabama
 WSAU-FM in Rudolph, Wisconsin
 WSMS in Artesia, Mississippi
  in Sandersville, Georgia
 WTGP-LP in Pikeville, Tennessee
  in Terre Haute, Indiana
  in Auburn, Maine
 WTUZ in Uhrichsville, Ohio
 WUCC in Williston, South Carolina
 WUCP-LP in Farragut, Tennessee
  in Virginia, Minnesota
 WVAF in Charleston, West Virginia
  in Mannsville, Kentucky
 WWCT in Bartonville, Illinois
  in Ocean City, Maryland
 WXJB in Homosassa, Florida
  in Erie, Pennsylvania
 WXJB in Brooksville, Florida
 WXMZ in Hartford, Kentucky
 WXTY in Lafayette, Florida
 WYHI in Park Forest, Illinois
 WYML-LP in Ingleside, Illinois
 WZAL-LP in Alabaster, Alabama
  in Stanleytown, Virginia
 WZJM-LP in Freeburg, Illinois
 WZNC-LP in Bethlehem, New Hampshire

Vietnam
VOH 99.9, in Ho Chi Minh city

References

Lists of radio stations by frequency